Celinów may refer to the following places:
Celinów, Rawa County in Łódź Voivodeship (central Poland)
Celinów, Garwolin County in Masovian Voivodeship (east-central Poland)
Celinów, Kozienice County in Masovian Voivodeship (east-central Poland)
Celinów, Mińsk County in Masovian Voivodeship (east-central Poland)